George Bernard Spartels (born 25 April 1954) is an Australian actor, presenter, director, playwright and children's musician of Greek descent on his father's ancestry, and English and Irish on his mother's. He remains best known for his role on the television soap opera Neighbours, playing family patriarch Benito Alessi, along with Prisoner and Bellbird star and soap veteran Elspeth Ballantyne as his wife Cathy Alessi, two sons Felice Arena And Dan Falzon, the Alessi family of Italian descent were added to the series in mid-1992, as a new family, joining already cast cousins, the Blakeney sisters.

Spartels was also a children's television presenter, having had a long tenure on ABC's Play School, over 14 years between 1985 and 1999. Other roles include Cop Shop in 1978, Prisoner in 1979, Punishment in 1981, the Bluestone Boys and Blackfinger in the movie Mad Max: Beyond Thunderdome in 1985, alongside Mel Gibson and Tina Turner.

Spartels' photoportrait, by Ivan Gaal, is in the permanent collection of the National Portrait Gallery.

Personal life
Spartels was previously married to Sue Spartels, followed by actress Elizabeth Alexander; married, in April 2013, to Mary Spartels and resided in Sydney, Australia. Divorced from Mary in 2017, he returned to Melbourne and commutes.

Spartels has guest starred in many other Australian television series from the 1970s to the present and has appeared in a number of episodes of medical drama series All Saints and serial Packed to the Rafters as Carbo's father. In 2014, he toured in Canada, LA and Australia in "The Last Confession" with David Suchet.

Awards
ARIA Music Awards

References

External links

Australian male television actors
Australian people of English descent
Australian people of Greek descent
Australian people of Irish descent
1951 births
Living people
Australian children's television presenters